Maddela Abel (30 December 1923 – 27 November 2012) was an Indian political scientist.  He was a prominent educationist, well known among University circles for his administration and served as Principal of Madras Christian College (1978–1981) and Vice Chancellor of Sri Krishnadevaraya University (1981–87).

Early life and education
Abel was born in Pedda Vangali, a village in Kurnool district of Andhra Pradesh (AP). He studied BA in Andhra Christian College (1945–48), and MA in Madras Christian College (1948–50). After teaching for several years at Madras Christian College (MCC), he went to University of California, Los Angeles on a Fulbright/Smith-Mundt Scholarship, earning a PhD in international relations in 1963. A member of the Phi Beta Kappa Society, he received the Danforth Foundation Fellowship in 1960 and was also named "best foreign student."

Career
Abel was Professor of Political Science in MCC from 1950, and Principal of MCC, 1978-81.  The Government of AP then invited him to be the first Vice-Chancellor of Sri Krishnadevaraya University (1981–87). Thereafter, he served as the first Vice-Chairman of AP State Council of Higher Education (1987–88).

He was an Executive Member of National Council of Churches in India, Executive Member of the Church of South India (CSI) Synod, and the President of the Christian Literature Society (CLS). CSI commissioned Abel to study the life, service and witness of the church. The outcome was the report, The Church of South India after Thirty Years. Report of the Abel Commission (CLS, 1978). It spoke of several reforms the Church in India needed to undertake.

Abel was awarded DLitt by Sri Krishnadevaraya University in 2005.

Writings
Apart from several Endowment Lectures, Abel also published numerous articles and several books. His articles deal with the areas of political administration, ideologies, economic development, subaltern studies, Dalit concerns, Christian higher education, and church administration.

In books

Abel, M. (2013). God and Government: Sermons on Society and Spirituality. Chennai: The Christian Literature Society.

In journals

See also
 Prof. Dr. T. D. J. Nagabhushanam, Ph. D. (IARI),
 Prof. Dr. P. A. James, Ph. D. (Osmania),
 Dr. J. A. Oliver, Ph. D. (ANGRAU),
 Prof. Dr. B. E. Vijayam, Ph. D. (Osmania),
 Prof. Dr. P. Judson, Ph. D. (Osmania)

Further reading

References

1923 births
Andhra University alumni
University of Madras alumni
University of California, Los Angeles alumni
Church of South India
Indian political scientists
Madras Christian College
People from Kurnool district
20th-century Indian educational theorists
Telugu people
Scholars from Andhra Pradesh
Indian Christians
2012 deaths